Air sports competition at the 2014 Asian Beach Games was held in Phuket, Thailand from 15 to 21 November 2014 at Chaofa Mine. The competition consisted of paragliding (accuracy competition) and paramotoring.

Medalists

Paragliding accuracy

Paramotoring

Medal table

Results

Paragliding accuracy

Men's individual
15–21 November

Men's team
15–21 November

Women's individual
15–21 November

 Lis Andriana was awarded bronze because of no three-medal sweep per country rule.

Women's team
15–21 November

Paramotoring

Individual economy
16–20 November

 Abdullatif Al-Qahtani was awarded bronze because of no three-medal sweep per country rule.

Individual precision
15–20 November

 Mohammed Al-Yafei was awarded bronze because of no three-medal sweep per country rule.

Individual combined
15–20 November

 Mohammed Al-Yafei was awarded bronze because of no three-medal sweep per country rule.

Team combined
15–20 November

References

External links 
 Official website

2014 Asian Beach Games events
2014
2014 in air sports